Leslie Quirk (born 6 March 1965) is an English former professional rugby league footballer who played in the 1980s and 1990s.

Playing career
Born in Ulverston, Quirk started his amateur career at Dalton, and made his professional début for Barrow in 1983. In 1987, he joined St. Helens for a fee of £55,000.

Quirk played in St. Helens' 15-14 victory over Leeds in the 1987–88 John Player Special Trophy Final during the 1987–88 season at Central Park, Wigan on Saturday 9 January 1988. He also played in two Challenge Cup finals at Wembley for Saints, but was on the losing side on both occasions.

Quirk also represented Cumbria, playing in an 18–13 victory over France in October 1988, and a 34–12 victory over Papua New Guinea in November 1991.

References

External links
 Statistics at rugbyleagueproject.org
 Profile at saints.org.uk
(archived by web.archive.org) Back on the Wembley trail

1965 births
Living people
Barrow Raiders players
Cumbria rugby league team players
English rugby league players
Rugby league players from Ulverston
Rugby league wingers
St Helens R.F.C. players
Whitehaven R.L.F.C. players